Latvian Danish red cattle are a rare Latvian breed of cattle. These cattle are descendants of the Danish Red Cattle.

Latvian Danish red cattle are used in both beef and dairy production.

References
Latvian Breeds

Cattle breeds
Cattle breeds originating in Latvia

Red cattle